Collybia (in the strict sense) is a genus of mushrooms in the family Tricholomataceae. The genus has a widespread but rare distribution in northern temperate areas, and contains three species that grow on the decomposing remains of other mushrooms.

Until recently a large number of other white-spored species, some very common, were assigned to this genus, but now the majority have been separated into other genera: Gymnopus, Rhodocollybia and Dendrocollybia.

Collybia sensu lato 
Collybia sensu lato is one of the groups of fungi of the order Agaricales that has created taxonomic differences of opinion in the scientific community. The generic name Collybia is due to Elias Magnus Fries and first appeared in 1821. Collybia was originally a tribe from an Agaricus classification. In 1857, Friedrich Staude recognized Collybia as a genus. The name Collybia means "small coin".  Later in his systematic work of 1838, Fries characterized Collybia as those species with
white spores,
incurved cap margin,
central cartilaginous stipe, and
fruit bodies which decay easily ("putrescent").
The last criterion divided these mushrooms from those of Marasmius, which had the property of being able to revive after having dried out (called "marcescent").  Although Fries considered this an important characteristic, some later authors like Charles Horton Peck (1897) and Calvin Henry Kauffman (1918) did not agree with Fries's criteria for the classification, and Gilliam (1976) discarded marcescence as a characteristic for the identification and differentiation of these genera.

At that point, the very varied genus encompassed the modern genera Oudemansiella (including Xerula), Crinipellis, Flammulina, Calocybe, Lyophyllum, Tephrocybe, Strobilurus, and others.

In 1993, Antonín and Noordeloos published the first part of a monograph of the genera Marasmius and Collybia after conducting a survey of these genera in Europe. In 1997, they published the second part of the monograph that included all Collybia species. In 1997, Antonín and colleagues published a generic concept within these two genera and organized the nomenclature to provide a new combination of genera: Gymnopus, Collybia, Dendrocollybia, Rhodocollybia and Marasmiellus.  The nomenclature and reclassification has since been supported by subsequent molecular analysis.  Most of these mushrooms belong to the family Marasmiaceae and have low convex caps and white gills, with adnate attachment to the stem.  This general form has given rise to the term collybioid, which is still in use to describe this type of fruit body.

Collybia sensu stricto 

The type species for Collybia is C. tuberosa, a small white parasitic mushroom (with caps up to ) which develops from a reddish-brown apple seed-shaped sclerotium in and on putrescent fungi or remaining in soil after complete decay of the host tissue.

The three species remaining in the genus are small (up to ). The caps are whitish and often radially wrinkled. All three species are saprobic, and grow on the decomposing remains of other mushrooms. When the genus was split up, the much-reduced genus was moved from Marasmiaceae to Tricholomataceae.

See also

List of Tricholomataceae genera
List of Marasmiaceae genera

References

Tricholomataceae
Agaricales genera

de:Rüblinge